Edo Marion (12 April 1910 – 1 December 2002) was a Slovenian foil and sabre fencer. He competed in three events at the 1936 Summer Olympics.

References

External links
 

1910 births
2002 deaths
Yugoslav male foil fencers
Yugoslav male sabre fencers
Olympic fencers of Yugoslavia
Fencers at the 1936 Summer Olympics
Sportspeople from Ljubljana
Slovenian male foil fencers
Slovenian male sabre fencers